Protelpidia is a monotypic genus of deep-sea sea cucumbers.

Species 
There is one species recognised in the genus Protelpidia:

 Protelpidia murrayi Théel, 1879

References 

Elpidiidae